{{Infobox basketball club
| color1        = #FFFFFF
| color2        = #008000
| color3        = #000000
| name          = Sagesse Club - Basketball team نادي الحكمة - فريق كرة السلة  
| nickname      = {{unbulleted list|القَلعَة الخَضراء (The Green Castle)<
أبطال آسيا (Kings of Asia)}}
| logo          = CS Sagesse logo.png
| image_size    = 150
| leagues       = Lebanese Basketball League (FLB League): Div.1
| founded       = 1992
| history       = Sagesse BC(1992–present)
| arena         = 
Antoine Choueiri Stadium
| capacity      = 5,000        
| location      = Ashrafieh, Beirut, Lebanon
| colors        = Green, White   
| president     = Elie Yahchouchi
| coach         =  joe Ghattas Gatuzo
| affiliation   = Collège de la Sagesse of the Maronite Catholic Archeparchy of Beirut
| championships = 8 Lebanese Championships 3 FIBA Asia Champions Cups   3 West Asian Championships  2 Arab Club Basketball Championships
| website       = http://www.sagesseclub.com/
| h_pattern_b   = _darkgreensidesoutline
| h_body        = 008040
| h_shorts      = 008040
| a_body        = ffffff
| a_shorts      = ffffff
| a_pattern_b   = _whitesidesoutline
}}

Sagesse Sports Club, known as Hekmeh in Arabic, is a Lebanese sports club based in Beirut.

The basketball team was established in 1992, as part of the Club Sagesse established in 1943 with mainly the football (soccer) team.

HistoryAl-Hikma in classical Arabic, El-Hekmeh in Lebanese dialect stands for "wisdom", thus also the French alternative name of the club, Sagesse (meaning wisdom in French).

The historical Hekmeh club was founded in Beirut in 1943 under the patronage of the late father Boulos Kik, supported by late Mgr. Jean Maroun, with affiliation to the Collège de la Sagesse of the Maronite Catholic Church a leading educational institution in Lebanon and the East since 1875 but despite the affiliation with the Sagesse College the club has its own independent administration. The basketball program was founded in 1992.

In 1992 the club was financed by media tycoon also dubbed as the Godfather of Lebanese basketball, president Antoine Choueiri, he wanted a team that will achieve unprecedented success and popularity in a bid to change Lebanese sports history forever and unite all Lebanese behind a successful team that will represent Lebanon and Lebanese basketball in every possible competition on a national and international level.

After the Choueiri takeover in 1992 Hekmeh/Sagesse included on its roster some of the most impactful player names including Lebanese national basketball team legends Elie Mechantaf and Fadi El Khatib, notable foreigners that at the time were among the elite of foreign basketball players in Asia including ex-NBA players and FIBA world cup participants a high level of players that was never seen before in the Lebanese league and the neighbouring countries and under the management of the most decorated national basketball coach Ghassan Sarkis, a dominant dream team was born taking Lebanese Basketball to new heights, achieving the goals that were set by Choueiri such as the ones mentioned in the previous passage.

Sagesse became one of the most successful basketball clubs in Lebanon and the MENA region with 8 Lebanese Basketball League Championships, 7 Lebanese Basketball Cups, 2 Arab Club Championships, and 3 FIBA Asia Champions Cup titles.
Hekmeh made history as well by being the first Lebanese club to win the Arab Club Championship and the first Lebanese and first Arab club to win the FIBA Asia Champions Cup.

Also, Sagesse is the only Arab and only Asian club to ever participate in the basketball club world championship, the McDonald's Championship organized by FIBA and the NBA, it was at the 1999 edition when Sagesse went as the Asian champions. The 1999 McDonald's Championship was the first and only time FIBA Asia was represented in the tournament.

This exceptional participation and the way Sagesse represented Asia at the Mcdonald's Championship in Milano was praised by then Commissioner of the NBA David Stern and by former Secretary General of the FIBA Borislav Stanković among other officials.

In 2012 Sagesse B.C. won a friendly game against Turkish team Galatasaray S.K. during a training camp that the club was holding in Turkey, this was the most significant game and win for a Lebanese team or any team in the region against a European team in recent times.

In the post Choueiri era, from 2004 onwards, which was the last year the team won the Lebanese Championship, the club struggled to find consistency at the administrative level despite the involvement of many businessmen and political figures, these involvements were seen as well as a possible reason for the club's struggles rather than being helpful gestures; and despite having the finances to build a good team the club was still struggling with debt; compared to the Choueiri era the club has achieved mediocre success with inconsistent overall form through the seasons in spite of reaching many finals in different competitions.

In the latest election of the club's general assembly "Choueiry Group" top official Mr. Elie Yahchouchi was elected club president; he was Antoine Choueiri's vice president during the late tycoon's tenure at the club.
Also Deputy Prime Minister of Lebanon H.E. Ghassan Hasbani was elected head of the board of trustees.
Many reforms, overhauls and major investments have been made since
in addition to constructive future plans that were announced in the club's huge team presentation ceremony ahead of the 2019/20 season.

 Rivalries 

 Beirut Derby 
There is often a fierce rivalry between the two strongest teams in a national league, and this is particularly the case in the Lebanese basketball league, where the classical game between Club Sagesse and Riyadi is known as Beirut Derby''.
From the start of the national league the clubs were seen as successful representatives of two different sides in Lebanon and the two most popular teams in the country.

Honours 

Lebanese Basketball League
Champions (8 Times): 1993-94, 1997–98, 1998–99, 1999-2000, 2000–01, 2001–02, 2002–03, 2003–04

Lebanese Basketball Cup
Champions (7 Times): 1993, 1998, 1999, 2000, 2001, 2002, 2003

Arab Club Championship
Champions (2 Times): 1998, 1999

FIBA Asia Champions Cup
Champions (3 Times): 1999, 2000, 2004. (Record)

WABA Champions Cup
Champions (3 Times):  2002, 2004, 2005
Runner-up          :  2006 ( Shared with Saba Battery, therefore no champion was crowned )

International friendly tournaments
1999 McDonald's Basketball Club World Championship (Participant) 
2001: Damascus International Tournament (champions)
2002: Dubai International Tournament (champions)
2014: Qadisiya International Tournament (champions)
2014: Abu Dhabi International Tournament (champions)
2016: Dubai International Tournament (champions)
2022 : Doha Avenue Tournament (champions)

Special Awards
1999 Best professional basketball team in Asia.
(Specially awarded by FIBA Asia known as the Asian Basketball Confederation back then for the first time in 1999 with Sagesse Club as the inaugural winner.)

Medals and decorations

 National Order of the Cedar

 Knight in 1999 

 Officer in 2000 

Awarded to the club for its unprecedented success in the Lebanese, Arab and Asian basketball championships that highly contributed into the development and rise of the Lebanese basketball and sports in Lebanon on many levels.

Squad

Notable people

Club presidents

 Antoine Choueiri
 Elie Mechantaf
 Elie Yahchouchi

Notable coaches
 Ghassan Sarkis
 Ilias Zouros
 Dragan Raca
 Tab Baldwin
 Veselin Matic
 Guillermo Vecchio

Notable players

Lebanese
 Elie Mechantaf
 Fadi El Khatib
  Rony Seikaly
  Brian Beshara
 Rodrigue Akl
 Rony Fahed
 Sabah Khoury
  Joe Vogel
  Julian Khazzouh 
 Elie Stephan
 Elie Rustom
 Walid Doumiati
 Joseph Chartouny
 Charles Tabet
International
 Kenny Satterfield
 Eric Chatfield
  Alpha Bangura
 Samaki Walker
 DeShawn Sims
 Terrell Stoglin
 Dewarick Spencer
 Quincy Douby
 Sherell Ford
 Randy Culpepper
 Chris Daniels
 Demarius Bolds
 Ekene Ibekwe
  Ater Majok
  DeWayne Jackson
  Walter Hodge
 Cedric Henderson
 Ratko Varda
 Darryl Watkins
 Jumaine Jones
 DerMarr Johnson

See also
CS Sagesse
CS Sagesse (football)

References

External links
Official Site

Basketball teams in Lebanon
Sport in Beirut
Organisations based in Beirut
1992 establishments in Lebanon
Sagesse SC
Basketball teams established in 1992